Nic Read (born 14 August 1967) is a British sales expert, researcher, author and conference speaker.

Biography
Born in Aldershot, Hampshire, England, Read was the founder and managing partner of SalesLabs, a revenue growth advisory firm. His views on sales, management, employment and leadership have been featured in magazines and blogs by Forbes, the American Management Association, Inc. (magazine), USA Today, Entrepreneur (magazine), Agency Sales, Selling Power magazine, Employee Benefits Adviser, and in television interviews on American Broadcasting Company's Washington Business Tonight, 3KTVK, KDVR, and Business Day (South Africa).

Researcher
In 2002, Read approached Dr. Steve Bistritz to partner on researching the genre of selling to executives. Bistritz had previously co-written a research paper titled Selling to Senior Executives How Salespeople Establish Trust and Credibility with Senior Executives. Read wanted to investigate if the findings of Bistritz's original research was specifically US-centric, or consistent across different business cultures. Between 2003 and 2007 more than 500 executives were interviewed or surveyed, making this study on executive buying behaviour the largest of its kind ever conducted. The business book Selling to the C-Suite: What Every Executive Wants You to Know About Successfully Selling to the Top is based on this research.

In the same period Read ran a parallel research project to understand how top sellers structured their Sales process when pursuing a simple product sale compared to a more complex solution sale. Instead of following the sales profession's ubiquitous sales funnel, top sellers were seen to use a less linear and more cyclical approach that emphasised customer intimacy. More importantly, the research documented specific approaches top salespeople applied which were not previously common knowledge. Other researchers and authors have drawn similar conclusions about the modern solution selling process. Read published the research findings in the McGraw-Hill business book Target Opportunity Selling: Top Sales Performers Reveal What Really Works.

In 2016, Read undertook research  to understand how to create high-performing key account management practices.

Author

Non-fiction
Read is the author of the following business books:

Selling to the C-Suite: What Every Executive Wants You to Know About Successfully Selling to the Top (McGraw-Hill, 2009). The term 'C-Suite' refers to business executives whose abbreviated title begins with a 'C', such as the CEO or CFO, but may also apply to other heads of departments and Board of directors members. The research and the book were published in response to the Financial crisis of 2007–08 which saw executives giving greater scrutiny to their company's purchases.

Target Opportunity Selling: Top Sales Performers Reveal What Really Works (McGraw-Hill, 2013). A 'target opportunity' is defined as a large Financial transaction between companies that may take months or years to win (see Closing (sales)), and so incurs a high Opportunity cost. The book was written to share observed Best practices drawn from field research on the subject matter.

Fiction
In 2008, he published the science-fiction E-book "Endworlds 1: Echoes of Worlds Past" as an exercise to prove if a work of fiction could find a fan base if it was guided by an analysis of plot rhythms from previous bestsellers. The book was co-authored in collaboration with Alan Dean Foster, the novelist of Spellsinger, Midworld, Alien, Star Trek: The Motion Picture and the original Star Wars.

The E-book of Endworlds was the first of its type produced with a motion picture-quality soundtrack, scored specifically for the book by British composer Jamie Salisbury. This was recorded by the 70-piece City of Prague Philharmonic Orchestra in May 2011 and mastered at Abbey Road Studios in London before being released as the E-book and a standalone music album.

International speaker
Read has delivered keynote speeches and seminars in training workshops and conferences to audiences in more than 40 countries. Among these he has appeared on stage at:
 2011 ThinkSales Sales Leadership Conference, in Johannesburg, South Africa.
 2010 Sales Managers Forum, in Athens, Greece.
 2010 Optimising the Sales Force, in Melbourne, Australia.
 2009 Selling Power Sales Leadership Conference, in Miami, Florida, US.
 2005 International Corporate Training & Development Conference, in Kuala Lumpur, Malaysia.
 2004 HR Directors Forum, in Shanghai China.

In 2016, Read co-authored a paper titled 'How to create high-performing key account management: lessons from the UK IT industry'. The paper was accepted for presentation at the annual British Academy of Management conference, and developed into an article for publication in Duke's Dialogue Journal.

Awards
Read has been recognised with the following awards:
 2005 Winner, Best Sales Trainer, International Stevie Awards
 2010 Honoree, Sales Education Leader of the Year, Stevie Awards for Sales & Customer Service
 2016 Third place, Best New Product, International Stevie Awards

Read was inducted as a Fellow of The Institute of Sales & Marketing Management in 2013.

References

Australian Latter Day Saints
Living people
Market researchers
1967 births
Businesspeople from Aldershot
People from Melbourne
British emigrants to Australia